The Men's Madison was one of the 10 men's events at the 2007 UCI Track World Championship, held in Palma de Mallorca, Spain. The event was won by the Swiss pairing of Franco Marvulli and Bruno Risi. Defending champions Spain was represented by Joan Llaneras and Carlos Torrent, following the death of Llaneras's long-time Madison partner Isaac Gálvez in November 2006.

16 teams, each of two riders participated in the contest. The Final was held on April 1, 2007, at 16:10.

Results

References

Men's madison
UCI Track Cycling World Championships – Men's madison